Chung Moon-kyung (born 1 March 1950) is a South Korean former volleyball player who competed in the 1976 Summer Olympics.

References

1950 births
Living people
South Korean men's volleyball players
Olympic volleyball players of South Korea
Volleyball players at the 1976 Summer Olympics
20th-century South Korean people